Starfighters Inc is a civilian organization that uses F-104 Starfighters for contract testing and flight simulations.

History
Starfighters Inc, based in Clearwater, Florida, began as a private venture founded in 1995 to restore and fly three former Canadair CF-104 Starfighters at air shows across the United States and Canada. Initially their CF-104s consisted of a two-seat CF-104D Serial#:104632 (registered as ), and two single-seat CF-104s Serial#s: 104850 (registered as ) and 104759 (registered as ). The aircraft were originally operated with the Royal Canadian Air Force and all later served with the Royal Norwegian Air Force before being imported into the U.S. in the early 1990s. In recent years the company has cut back on air show appearances as they have transitioned to using their aircraft for government and private contract work, providing high-performance photo chase planes on flight tests, simulating enemy aircraft in military defense exercises, and modelling ballistic missiles for detection system evaluation.  In summer 2011 the company acquired five additional aircraft.  The estimated cost of restoration of each of the five aircraft is $1 million.

Fleet
 CF-104D, ex-Canadian Armed Forces serial number 104632, registered as N104RB
 CF-104G, ex-Canadian Armed Forces serial number 104759, registered as N104RN
 CF-104G, ex-Canadian Armed Forces serial number 104850, registered as N104RD
 F-104B, ex-USAF serial number 56-1296, registered as N65354
 F-104S, ex-Italian Air Forces serial number MM6734, registered as N993SF
 TF-104G-M serial number 54251, registered as N990SF  
 TF-104G-M serial number 54258, registered as N991SF
 TF-104G-M serial number 54261, registered as N992SF

References

External links

 Starfighters, Inc Official
 Hi-res virtual tours of the Starfighter Aerospace fleet

American aerobatic teams
1995 establishments in Florida